Muttukadu boat house (Tamil: முட்டுக்காடு படகுக் குழாம்) is a water sport facility on the East Coast Road at Muttukadu, Chennai City, Kanchipuram district, Tamil Nadu, India, offering rowing, wind surfing, water skiing, and speedboat riding. The boat house was inaugurated in 1984 and has 15 row boats, 27 speedboats and 9 pedal boats, besides two high-speed aqua scooters. The water depth varies between 3 ft and 6 ft. It is owned and operated by the Tamil Nadu Tourism Development Corporation (TTDC). The boating spot receives more than 4,000 visitors every weekend.

In July 2009, TTDC inaugurated a new bamboo boathouse and a floating boat jetty at the Muttukadu boating facility. The boathouse, with a special roof made of bamboo, has a lounge, from where visitors can watch the boats, and a restaurant. The building has been constructed at a cost of  8.7 million and the floating jetty at a cost of  1.2 million. A couple of high-speed aqua scooters with a seating capacity of three was also introduced at a cost of  1.35 million, which has received good patronage. The scooters can sail at an average speed of 120 km/hour.

The boat house has a multi-cuisine restaurant named "Surf", a unit of Coral. In the recent Chennai flood of 2015, Muttukadu boats were used to rescue people on the outskirts of Chennai city.

Developments

The TTDC is planning to introduce sailing near the boating facility as a private-public partnership venture. The Tamil Nadu Tourism Department is also planning to develop the boat house, along with Mudaliarkuppam boat house and Mamallapuram, using funds from Asian Development Bank.

In 2008, the TTDC was in process of upgrading facilities at the boat house at the cost of  8 million. It would include a new floating jetty and extension of the boat house.

Events
In 2008, TTDC conducted a boat race in Muttukadu, in association with the Madras Boat Club.

See also

 Mudaliarkuppam boat house

References

Tourist attractions in Chennai
Sport in Chennai
Boathouses in Chennai
1984 establishments in Tamil Nadu
Sports venues completed in 1984